HMS H23 was a British H class submarine built by Vickers Limited, Barrow-in-Furness as part of the Batch-3 H class submarine. She was launched on 29 January 1918 and was commissioned on 25 May 1918. She had a complement of 22 crew members.

HMS H23 was sold on 4 May 1934 in Sunderland.

Design

H23 was fitted with an anti-aircraft gun and four  torpedo tubes. Its torpedo tubes were fitted to the bows and the submarine was loaded with eight  torpedoes. It is a Holland 602 type submarine but was designed to meet Royal Navy specifications. Its complement was twenty-two crew members.

References

Bibliography
 

 

British H-class submarines
Ships built in Barrow-in-Furness
1918 ships
World War I submarines of the United Kingdom
Royal Navy ship names